The Dean's December is a 1982 novel by the American author Saul Bellow.

Setting
The first novel Bellow published after winning the Nobel Prize in Literature in 1976, it is set in Chicago and Bucharest.

Plot
The book's main character, Albert Corde, a meditative academic who faces a crisis, accompanies his Romanian-born astrophysicist wife to her Communist-ruled native country, where they deal with the death of his mother-in-law. This sojourn allows Corde to observe the workings of a totalitarian regime in particular and the Eastern Bloc in general, a perspective which provides him with insight into the human condition.

Reception
In the New York Times Book Review, critic Robert Towers concluded, “The Dean's December confirms me in the opinion I have held since, nearly 30 years ago, I read The Adventures of Augie March (having, as an impecunious instructor, paid out hard cash for my hardcover copy just off the press): Sentence by sentence, page by page, Saul Bellow is simply the best writer that we have.”

References

External links
 
 The New York Times Book Review on The Dean’s December

1982 American novels
Bucharest in fiction
Socialist Republic of Romania
Novels by Saul Bellow
Novels set in Chicago
Harper & Row books